Sir Theobald Butler, 1st Baron Cahir, Caher, or Cahier (died 1596) was the first baron Cahir of the second creation, which occurred in 1583.

Birth and origin 

Theobald was the eldest son of Piers Butler and his wife, née Butler, whose first name is unknown. His father was the younger brother of Thomas Butler, 1st Baron Cahir of the first creation. His father's family, the Butlers of Cahir (also spelt Caher or Cahier) were a cadet line of the Butlers of Ormond that started with James Gallda Butler, a younger son of James Butler, 3rd Earl of Ormond. His mother was a daughter of MacPierce, Lord Dunboyne.

Battle of Affane 
His father, Piers Butler, felt that he was oppressed by Ormond and sided in 1565 with Gerald FitzGerald, 14th Earl of Desmond fighting on the losing side against the Ormonds in the Battle of Affane.

Marriage and children 
Butler married Mary Cusack, daughter of Sir Thomas Cusack of Cussington, County Meath, Lord Chancellor of Ireland, and his second wife Maud Darcy.

 
Theobald and Mary had six sons:
 Thomas Butler, 2nd Baron Cahir ( – 1627), his successor
 Piers of Cloghcullie (Clocully), County Tipperary, who married Eleanor, the daughter of Pierce Butler of Callan, County Kilkenny and left a son Thomas;, who became the 3rd Baron
 Edmund Butler, died childless
 Richard of Clonbrogan, the father of Pierce whose son Theobald became the 5th Baron Cahir.
 James of Knocklofty (died 1630), whose son Theobald (died 1630) was involved in the rebellion of 1598
 John, of Cloughbridy

—and two or three daughters:
 Ellen, married Richard Butler of Ballyboe, County Tipperary
 Mary, married Cormac MacDermot MacCarthy, 16th Lord of Muskerry, and was the mother of Charles MacCarthy, 1st Viscount Muskerry
 Eleanor (although her existence is debatable), who was said to have married John Butler, eldest son of James Butler, 2nd Baron Dunboyne; but the claim, made in the course of an inheritance dispute over the right to the Dunboyne title, was probably false.

Knight 
In 1567 Butler was knighted at Clonmel by Henry Sidney, who had been appointed lord deputy of Ireland in 1565.

Baron Cahir 
Butler was the nephew of Thomas Butler, 1st Baron Cahir (of the first creation, which occurred in 1542). When Butler's first cousin Edmund, the 2nd Baron, died without issue in 1560, the title became extinct. It was, however, revived on 6 May 1583 by Queen Elizabeth I of England in Butler's favour. He became the 1st Baron Cahir (of the second creation) and ruled much of the barony of Iffa and Offa West.

Death and timeline 
Cahir died on 28 April 1596 at Cahir, County Tipperary. He was succeeded by his eldest son Thomas as the 2nd Baron Cahir of the second creation.

Notes and references

Notes

Citations

Sources 

  – 1558 to 1578
 
  – L to M (for Muskerry)
  – Bass to Canning (for Caher)
  – (for timeline)
  – Viscounts, barons
 
 

1596 deaths
16th-century Anglo-Irish people
Barons in the Peerage of Ireland
Theobald
Peers of Ireland created by Elizabeth I
Year of birth uncertain